Redneck Shit is the debut album by American country music artist Wheeler Walker, Jr., released in 2016.  The satirical comedy album debuted at No. 9 on the Billboard Top Country albums chart and No. 1 on the Comedy Albums chart.  Originally, the single 'Drop 'em Out' debuted on PornHub.

Track listing

Charts

References

2016 debut albums
Ben Hoffman albums
Albums produced by Dave Cobb